Sir Rupert Grant Alexander Clarke is the 4th Baronet Clarke of Rupertswood, having succeeded his father, Sir Rupert Clarke, 3rd Baronet.

The Clarke of Rupertswood baronetcy, granted 1882, is one of only two extant of Australian territorial designation.

Sir Rupert Clarke lives in Melbourne, Australia, and succeeded his father when he died in 2005.

References

Year of birth missing (living people)
Living people
Baronets in the Baronetage of the United Kingdom
Clarke baronets